The 2001–02 OHL season was the 22nd season of the Ontario Hockey League. Twenty teams each played 68 games. The Erie Otters defeated the Barrie Colts for the J. Ross Robertson Cup.

Regular season

Final standings
Note: DIV = Division; GP = Games played; W = Wins; L = Losses; T = Ties; OTL = Overtime losses; GF = Goals for; GA = Goals against; PTS = Points; x = clinched playoff berth; y = clinched division title; z = clinched conference title

Eastern conference

Western conference

Scoring leaders

Zenon Konopka had the most assists (68).

Playoffs

Conference quarterfinals

Eastern conference

Western conference

Conference semifinals

Conference finals

J. Ross Robertson Cup finals

J. Ross Robertson Cup Champions Roster

All-Star teams

First team
Brad Boyes, Centre, Erie Otters
Nathan Robinson, Left Wing, Belleville Bulls
Cory Pecker, Right Wing, Erie Otters
Erik Reitz, Defence, Barrie Colts
Mark Popovic, Defence, Toronto St. Michael's Majors
Ray Emery, Goaltender, Sault Ste. Marie Greyhounds
Craig Hartsburg, Coach, Sault Ste. Marie Greyhounds

Second team
Kris Newbury, Centre, Sarnia Sting
Steve Ott, Left Wing, Windsor Spitfires
Mike Renzi, Right Wing, Belleville Bulls
Carlo Colaiacovo, Defence, Erie Otters
Steve Eminger, Defence, Kitchener Rangers
Peter Budaj, Goaltender, Toronto St. Michael's Majors
Dave Cameron, Coach, Toronto St. Michael's Majors

Third team
Jason Spezza, Centre, Belleville Bulls
Rick Nash, Left Wing, London Knights
Miguel Delisle, Right Wing, Ottawa 67's
Kevin Dallman, Defence, Guelph Storm
Fedor Tyutin, Defence, Guelph Storm
David Chant, Goaltender, Barrie Colts
Dave MacQueen, Coach, Erie Otters

Awards

2002 OHL Priority Selection
On May 4, 2002, the OHL conducted the 2002 Ontario Hockey League Priority Selection. The Mississauga IceDogs held the first overall pick in the draft, and selected Rob Schremp from the Syracuse Stars. Schremp was awarded the Jack Ferguson Award, awarded to the top pick in the draft.

Below are the players who were selected in the first round of the 2002 Ontario Hockey League Priority Selection.

See also
List of OHA Junior A standings
List of OHL seasons
2002 Memorial Cup
2002 NHL Entry Draft
2001 in sports
2002 in sports

References
HockeyDB

Ontario Hockey League seasons
OHL